Dmitri Mendeleev (1834–1907) was a Russian chemist.

Mendeleyev (masculine) or Mendeleyeva (feminine or masculine genitive) may also refer to:
Mendeleev (crater), a crater on the far side of the Moon
Mendeleev Ridge, a ridge under the Arctic Ocean
Mendeleevbreen, glacier in Svalbard
Mendeleyev Glacier, a glacier in Antarctica
Mendeleyeva, a stratovolcano in the Kuril Islands, Russia

See also
Mendeleyevo, several inhabited localities in Russia
Mendeleyevsk, a town in the Republic of Tatarstan, Russia
Mendeleyevsky (disambiguation)